Sena Nur Çelik (born 5 August 1986, Alanya , Turkey) is a Turkish politician and member of the Turkish Parliament for the Justice and Development Party.

References

Living people
1986 births
Turkish political people
People from Alanya